Hendon Football Club was an English association football club founded in about 1876. The club was based at Hendon, today in the London Borough of Barnet, and played its home games at the Hendon cricket ground in Brampton Grove, off Brent Street, London NW4. The club appeared in the F.A. Cup between 1877 and 1887 and had one of its players selected for England in 1884.

FA Cup history
The club's greatest achievement was on 10 November 1883 when it defeated the previous season's FA Cup finalists Old Etonians by three goals to two.

1877–78
First Round – Defeated 2–0 by Marlow

1878–79
First Round – Defeated 1–0 by Reading

1879–80
First Round – Drew 1–1 with Old Foresters
First Round Replay – Drew 2–2
First Round Second Replay – Won 3–1
Second Round – Won 7–1 v. Mosquitos
Third Round – Bye
Fourth Round – Defeated 2–0 by Clapham Rovers

1880–81
First Round – Won 8–1 v. St Peter's Institute
Second Round – Defeated 2–0 by Old Etonians

1881–82
First Round – Defeated 5–0 by Reading

1882–83
First Round – Won 3–1 v. West End
Second Round – Won 2–1 v. Chatham
Third Round – Won 11–1 v. South Reading
Fourth Round – Won 3–0 v. Marlow
Fifth Round – Defeated 4–2 by Old Etonians

1883–84
First Round – Won 3–2 v. Old Etonians
Second Round – Defeated 2–1 by Old Westminsters

1884–85
First Round – Drew 3–3 with Clapham Rovers
First Round Replay – Won 6–0
Second Round – Defeated 1–0 by Chatham

1885–86
First Round – Defeated 4–0 by Clapton

1886–87
First Round – Defeated 2–1 by London Caledonians

1887–88
First Round – Defeated 4–2 by Old Harrovians

Later history
The club continued in existence into the 1930s and is known to have been playing in 1937. There is no direct connection between the original club and the present day Hendon F.C., which was founded in 1908 as Christ Church Hampstead and took its present name in 1946. The two clubs played each other twice in April 1932 to raise funds.

Famous players
Charles Plumpton Wilson made two appearances for England in 1883–84.

Colours

The Charles Alcock annuals record the following colours for the club:

References

External links
Hendon F.C. on Football Club History Database
England Players' Club Affiliations – Hendon

Association football clubs established in 1876
Defunct football clubs in England
Sport in the London Borough of Barnet
1876 establishments in England
Defunct football clubs in London
Hendon
Association football clubs disestablished in the 20th century
London League (football)